Marcia Warren (born 26 November 1942) is an English stage, film and television actress. On stage, she appeared in Blithe Spirit as Madame Arcati and The Sea (2008) at the Theatre Royal, Haymarket. She is currently appearing in Netflix's fifth season of The Crown, in which she plays Queen Elizabeth The Queen Mother.

She is a two time Olivier Award winner.

Early life
Warren trained as an actress at Guildhall School of Music and Drama in London, graduating in 1963. From there on she took the path of many of her performing contemporaries, acting in repertory throughout the country – beginning as an assistant stage manager in David Copperfield in Salisbury.

Career
From 1983 to 1986 she played Vera in the BBC sitcom, No Place Like Home.  From 2013 to 2016, she played the role of Penelope in the ITV sitcom Vicious and also starred in the 2014 sitcom Edge of Heaven as Nanny Mo. She has also appeared in Keeping Up Appearances, Midsomer Murders and Inside No. 9.

Awards
She has won two Laurence Olivier Theatre Awards for Best Actress in a Supporting Role—one in 1984 for Stepping Out and the other in 2002 for Humble Boy at the Royal National Theatre. She was also nominated for another in 2001 for In Flame at the New Ambassadors Theatre.

Filmography
Film

Television

Video games

References

External links

20 Questions ... Marcia Warren. WhatsOnStage, 2003-2-10

Living people
English film actresses
English stage actresses
English television actresses
Laurence Olivier Award winners
People from Watford
1943 births
Actresses from Hertfordshire
20th-century English actresses
21st-century English actresses